Club Deportes Tolima S.A., commonly known as Deportes Tolima, or simply as Tolima, is a Colombian professional football club based in Ibagué, Tolima Department that currently plays in the Categoría Primera A.

Founded in 1954, the club has won the Colombian top tier thrice: in the 2003–II, 2018–I, and 2021–I tournaments, and the Copa Colombia once: in 2014. They play their home games at Estadio Manuel Murillo Toro.

History

Foundation
Club Deportes Tolima was founded by Manuel Rubio Chávez on 18 December 1954, when he gave Juan Barbieri (an Argentinian living in Ibagué, Colombia) a sum of $5.000 Colombian pesos in order to hire soccer players from his native country. Barbieri came back to Colombia with a mix of Argentine and Colombian players like Jorge Gandulfo, José Jamardo and Enrique Laino. This team competed for the first time in the Colombian football league in 1955, using the uniform of Argentine club Racing Club. In Tolima's league debut, they finished 7th in the league competing with 9 other teams. In 1957, the club finished runner-up in the league.

1980s and 1990s
Senator Gabriel Camargo Salamanca was given the opportunity to work for the team in the 1980s. He accepted, becoming the biggest stock holder of the team. He bought important players such as Francisco Maturana, Óscar Héctor Quintabani, Osvaldo Redondo, Arnoldo Iguarán, Óscar López, and Janio Cabezas. With this team Deportes Tolima finished as league runner-ups in 1981 and 1982. Tolima participated for the first time in an international tournament with the 1982 Copa Libertadores, where the club reached the semi-finals after topping their group consisting of Atlético Nacional , Estudiantes de Mérida, and Deportivo Táchira. The team also played the Copa Libertadores the following year, in 1983, where the team was eliminated in the first round after placing second in their group.

In 1993, the club was relegated to the Primera B, or the second division, because of poor results. Tolima played for one year in the second division but won the title, which allowed them to make an immediate return to the top tier for the 1995 season.

The first star: 2003
Deportes Tolima had a very interesting group of players for the second half of 2003. These players included Ricardo Ciciliano, Henry Zambrano, Yulián Anchico, Oscar Briceño, Jhon Charría, Jorge Artigas, Nelson Rivas, and Diego Gómez among others. Deportes Tolima finished in sixth place in the league and qualified to the playoffs. The club was placed in a group with against Atlético Nacional, Atlético Junior, and Independiente Medellín. When everyone predicted Atlético Junior would finish first in the mini league and would go to the final, Deportes Tolima beat Atlético Nacional 2–0 in Ibagué and Atlético Junior lost 1–0 to Independiente Medellín in Medellín. WIth these results, Deportes Tolima qualified to the final against Deportivo Cali on head-to-head results after tying Junior on points. Tolima won the first game 2–0 in Ibagué with an exceptional performance of Rogeiro Pereira, who scored both goals. In the second leg Tolima lost 3–1 in Cali, which forced penalty kicks as the aggregate score was 3–3. In the penalty shootout, Deportes Tolima only missed one penalty and goalkeeper Diego Gómez saved two penalties, which helped the club win the league title for the first time in history.

As league champion, Tolima qualified for the 2004 Copa Libertadores, where they were eliminated in the group stage with a third-placed finish.

2006 runners-up

2006 was a great year for Tolima. The team was second on the overall table (points added up over the Apertura and Clausura tournaments), scored the most goals in the year (over 80), and were runners up in the league for 2006-II. At the beginning of 2006, Deportes Tolima did not seem like a very strong team for the season as it did not sign any new players. The coach was Jorge Luis Bernal, who had been the reserve team coach for many years. However, the team performed well in both home and away games, with victories against Envigado 7–3, Atlético Nacional 5–1, Millonarios away 3–0 and Huila away 4–1. They reached the semi-finals of the 2006-I tournament and were placed in a group with Deportivo Pereira, Deportivo Cali, and Once Caldas, and were in route to making the finals until they lost an important game against Pereira, who finished last in the group. Tolima won their last game, but eventually finished in second, three points behind Cali.

The 2006-II campaign was even better than the first one. Tolima ended first in the league, and played the semi-finals against Atlético Nacional, Deportivo Pasto, and Boyacá Chicó. Atlético Nacional were leaders of the group most of the time, while Deportes Tolima remained a point behind. A dramatic 2–1 away win over Atlético Nacional made them leaders, and they advanced to the final against Cúcuta Deportivo after a 2–0 win over Boyacá Chicó. The first game was away in Cúcuta and Tolima lost 1–0; later in Ibagué the game ended tied 1–1, with Yulián Anchico scoring Tolima's goal, but it wasn't enough to win the league title.

Since Tolima finished fifth in the 2005 overall table, they were able to play the 2006 Copa Sudamericana. The team began the competition in the first stage, where they beat Independiente Medellín 4–2 on aggregate. In the next stage, Tolima tied against Mineros de Guayana on aggregate, but passed to the next round on the away goals rule. In the third round, the club was matched up with Pachuca. Tolima won the first leg 2–1 at home, but in the second leg in Mexico they lost 5–1, and Tolima was eliminated from the competition, while Pachuca went on to become champion of the cup. At the end of the year, Bernal left the club.

2007–2009 
For the 2007 season Deportes Tolima signed important players like defenders Nicolás Ayr and Javier Arizala, strikers Gustavo Savoia and Jorge Perlaza, and midfielder Jésus Sinisterra. Tolima also got a new coach, Jaime de la Pava. Since Tolima finished second in the 2006 overall table, they qualified for the 2007 Copa Libertadores. They began their campaign in the tournament by defeating Deportivo Táchira on aggregate in the first stage, which qualified the club to the group stage with Grêmio, Cerro Porteño and the team that beat Tolima in the 2006 Finalizacion finals, Cúcuta Deportivo. Tolima finished third in the group stage and was eliminated after losing to Cucuta Deportivo at home. In the Apertura tournament, Tolima finished in 12th position, missing out on the playoffs. Shortly after, Jaime de la Pava left his post, citing the failure to qualify to the Liberadores knockout stages and missing out on the playoffs as his reasoning.

Fot the 2007 Finalizacion, Jaime de la Pava was replaced by long-time assistant manager Hernán Torres. Tolima qualified to the playoffs as the fourth seed, but failed to reach the finals, finishing third in the group. In the 2008 Apertura, Tolima had a terrible campaign, finishing last in the table, which included heavy losses to Boyaca Chico (7–2) and Independiente Medellin (4–1). This was mainly due to the departures of forwards Jorge Horacio Serna and Darwin Quintero. Despite the terrible campaign, the board decided to keep Torres for the 2008 Finalizacion, where they had a much better campaign, finishing as the first seed in the regular season and qualifying for the playoffs. In the playoffs, Tolima were expected to make the finals after leading the table with four out of six games player, but in the fifth game, La Equidad won, effectively crushing the Pijao's hopes of making the finals, since Medellin and Nacional had tied. Although Tolima later beat finalists Medellin 4–1 in the last matchday, it was useless but still gave the Tolima fans a chance to celebrate a big victory over one of the best teams in the league, and more support for manager Torres as the beginning of a new era.

For the 2009 Apertura, Tolima finished first in the table again and qualified for the playoffs. In the playoffs however, the team was inconsistent and struggles to score, eventually missing out on the finals again. In the 2009 Finalizacion Tolima finished fifth and qualified for the playoffs, but finished last in their group. In the annual table, Tolima finished second, but only qualified for the Copa Sudamericana because the third placed team, Medellin, won the Finalizacion and took the Libertadores spot.

2010s
In the 2010 Apertura, Tolima finished first in the regular season, this being the third time they do so in the last four tournaments. In the playoffs, there was a new format of direct elimination with home and away games. Tolima were matched up with La Equidad, who eliminated them in a penalty shootout after a 3–3 draw on aggregate. For the 2010 Finalizacion the team topped the regular season table again, qualifying for the playoffs, and won their playoff group to make the finals. In the finals, they played Once Caldas: in the first leg at Estadio Manuel Murillo Toro, Tolima won 2–1. However, in the second leg, Once Caldas won 3–1, and won the title 4–3 on aggregate, leaving Tolima and their fans in disappointment after having such an excellent campaign but not being the champion.

The team began their 2010 Sudamericana campaign in the second stage, beating Bolivian club Oriente Petrolero. In the round of 16, Tolima was matched up with Banfield; a 2–0 loss in Argentina left Tolima halfway knocked out, but in the second leg in Ibague, Tolima produced a great comeback and won 3–0 to eliminate them. In the quarter-finals, Tolima was paired with Independiente, with the first leg in Ibague finishing in a 2–2 draw. The second leg in Avellaneda finished in a 0–0 draw, with a controversial Tolima goal being disallowed, but the draw meant Independiente progressed to the semi-finals on away goals. Independiente went on to win the competition, which gave the sensation that Tolima had a great campaign since they almost eliminated the champions.

The club finished first in the 2010 annual table, and qualified for the first stage of the 2011 Copa Libertadores. Usually the first-placed team qualifies for the group stage, but since the second placed team, Once Caldas, was the champion, the spot was passed down to them. In the first stage, Tolima produced a massive upset by beating Ronaldo's Corinthians 2–0. In the next few days after the match, Ronaldo announced his retirement, with the match against Tolima being the last of his professional career. The Colombian club progressed to the group stage with high expectations after the win against Corinthians, but finished third and was eliminated, including a humiliating 6–1 defeat to Cruzeiro.

In 2014, Tolima won the Copa Colombia for the first time in the club's history, beating Independiente Santa Fe in the finals 3–2 on aggregate.

In June 2018, Tolima won its second league title, beating Atletico Nacional in the finals in spectacular fashion. During the second leg in Medellín, Tolima were down 2–1 on aggregate in the 90th minute, and everyone was getting ready for the trophy celebration. However, Danovis Banguero scored in the last kick of the game at the 94th minute, which sent the game into a penalty shootout that Tolima won 4–2, ending Nacional's 35 game unbeaten streak and a 15-year drought between titles. In the 2018 Finalizacion, they finished first in the regular season table, but were eliminated by finalists Independiente Medellin 2–4 on aggregate in the semi-finals.

Stadium

Honours

Categoría Primera A
Winners (3): 2003–II, 2018–I, 2021–I
Runners-up (8): 1957, 1981, 1982, 2006–II, 2010–II, 2016–II, 2021–II, 2022–I
Copa Colombia
Winners (1): 2014
Runners-up (1): 2020
Superliga Colombiana
Winners (1): 2022
Runners-up (1): 2019
Categoría Primera B
Winners (1): 1994

Performance in CONMEBOL competitions
Copa Libertadores: 6 appearances
1982: Semi-finals
1983: Group Stage
2004: Group Stage
2007: Second Stage
2011: Second Stage
2013: Second Stage

Copa Sudamericana: 4 appearances
2006: Third Round
2010: Quarter-finals
2012: Second Stage
2015: Round of 16

Copa CONMEBOL: 2 appearances
1996: First Round
1997: Quarter-finals

Players

Current squad

Notable players

 José Jamardo (1955–60), (1965–67)
 German Castellanos (1961–74)
 Tito Ramón Correa (1979–81)
  Cristino Centurión (1980–82)
  Víctor del Río (1980–82), (1984)
 Óscar López (1981)
 Américo Quiñonez (1981–82)
 Arnoldo Iguarán (1982)
 Evaristo Isasi (1982)
 Freddy Clavijo (1982–83)
 José Luis Russo (1983–84)
 Hebert Revetria (1984)
 Teodor Kovač (1986)
 Albeiro Usuriaga (1987)
 Fabio Giménez (1991–92)
 Álex Fernández (1993)
 Leonardo Fabio Moreno (1994–95)
 Julio César Yegros (1994–95)
 Orlando Maturana (1995–97), (1999)
 Luis Antonio Moreno (1995–01)
 Luis Carlos Perea (1996)
 Felix Ademola (1996)
 Gerardo Bedoya (1996–97)
 Luis Quiñónes (1996–99)
 Roy Myers (1997)
 Walter Avalos (1997)
 Luis Barbat (1997–99)
 Álex Orrego (1997–00), (2002)
 Wilmer López (1998)
 Gustavo Matosas (1998)
 Arley Dinas (1998–00), (2003–05)
 Gonzalo Martínez (1998–01), (2005)
 Elson Becerra (1998–02)
 Wilmer Cabrera (1999–00)
 Oscar Passo (1999–05)
 Jhon Charría (2000), (2002–08)
 Luis Tejada (2003–04)
 Jorge Artigas (2003)
 Rogerio Pereira (2003)
 Diego Gómez (2003–04), (2006)
 Yulián Anchico (2003–07)
 Gerardo Vallejo (2004), (2005–12)
 Agustín Julio (2004–07)
 Javier Arizala (2004–07)
 Juan Carlos Escobar (2004–07), (2012)
 Silvio Garay (2005)
 Víctor Bonilla (2005)
 Carlos Quintero (2005–07)
 Gauchinho (2006)
  Alex da Rosa (2006)
 Gilberto García (2006–07), (2008)
 Gustavo Savoia (2007)
 Jésus Sinisterra (2007)
 Carlos González (2007–08)
 Jorge Perlaza (2007–10)
 Gustavo Bolívar (2007–12)
 Fernando Oliveira (2007–08)
 David Villalba (2008)
 Bréiner Castillo (2008–10)
 Cristian Marrugo (2008–12)
 Wilder Medina (2008–11)
 José Cáceres (2009)
 Hugo Centurión (2010)
 Julio Ortellado (2010)
 Rodrigo Marangoni (2010)
 Diego Chará (2010–11)
 Antony Silva (2010–14)
 Luis Closa (2011)
 Roberto Gamarra (2011)
 Pablo Giménez (2011)
 Diego Cabrera (2011)
 Robin Ramírez (2012)
 Manuel Maciel (2012)
 David Macalister Silva (2012–14)
 Andrés Andrade (2012–13)
 Jhon Valencia (2013–)
  Rogerio Leichtweis (2013)
 Sergio Otálvaro (2013)
 Roberto Merino (2013)
 Yimmi Chará (2014)
 Marco Pérez (2014–)
 Mateus Uribe (2015–16)
 Joel Silva (2015–)
 Gabriel Gómez (2016)
 Santiago Montoya (2016–17)
 Ángelo Rodríguez (2016–18)
 Luis Ovalle (2017)
 Sebastián Villa (2018)
 Yohandry Orozco (2018)

Managers

References

External links

 Guerreros Pijaos – La Web de los verdaderos hinchas
 Furia Pijao – La verdad sobre el Vinotinto y Oro
 Deportes Tolima– Official Website
 Revoluvion Vinotinto
 Deportes Tolima

Football clubs in Colombia
Association football clubs established in 1954
1954 establishments in Colombia
Categoría Primera A clubs
Categoría Primera B clubs